Arasu (Search/King) is a 2007 Indian Kannada-language romantic drama film directed by Mahesh Babu. It features Puneeth Rajkumar in the title role as the son of a business tycoon who leaves his inherited wealth to make a living on his own upon being rejected by a girl played by Ramya who he proposes to in marriage. When a middle-class girl played by Meera Jasmine enters their lives, it soon turns out to be a love triangle. Srinivasa Murthy, Komal and Adi Lokesh appear in supporting roles. Kannada film actors Darshan and Aditya made cameo appearance. Actress Shriya Saran also made a cameo appearance in the film, her first Kannada language film. The movie was dubbed in Hindi as Zinda Dili  and in Marathi as Premachi Satva Pariksha.

Plot
Shivaraj Aras is a non-resident Indian from a rich business family who idles away spending their money. He is advised to return to India by his manager Ramanna to run the well-progressing companies he heads. Once in India, Aras finds it hard to adjust after living a luxurious and carefree in America. He falls in love with Ramanna's daughter Shruthi and proposes marriage, but she blasts his spoiled lifestyle and challenges him to earn at least 5,000 for a month on his own before she can think of considering his proposal, and also makes a caustic remark on the company. This startles Aras who takes up the challenge quitting the company and goes in search of a job.

Now on streets without a single penny in his pocket Shivaraj struggles hard. Hungry, he asks for a meal at a hotel and is surprised by the low prices there, but gets thrown out when the hotelier does not believe his promise to pay them back a hundredfold. He finds an old lady selling bananas. He repeats the same and eats two bananas and promises Rs. 200,000 for the old lady after a month. At this stage he finds an ordinary girl Aishwarya. The muscle power of Shivaraj when the rowdies attack her earns good name. Shivaraj also gets a job as a sales representative in the saree shop where Aishwarya is working. He finds a place to live in the small room of Aishwarya. Aishwarya turns very sympathetic and Shivaraj decides to stay in the house for one month. Shivaraj sleeps on the floor and his wonderful behavior and lot of help for the people in his colony gives him a comfortable standing. He owes a lot for Sruthi for her remark that has changed his life style and he is extremely happy with Aishwarya for supporting him in knowing the hard realities in life.

Shivaraj is liked immensely by Aishwarya in this one month. On the other hand, Sruthi is also in love with Shivaraj and ready to marry him. It turns out that Sruthi and Aishwarya are actually very close friends. Shivaraj is not aware that Aishwarya is in love with him but Aishwarya declares to Shruthi that she is in love with Shivaraj that surprises her. Now Sruthi decides to give up his love for the sake of her friend Aishwarya. On the other hand, Aishwarya knowing that Sruthi is ready for marriage with Shivaraj also comes forward for sacrifice of her love. Not knowing what to do the intelligent Shivaraj takes a bold step. Without revealing his decision he convinces both to marry his good friends Vijay and Vinay. In return, the friends arrange for another woman Arpitha to come to Shivaraj, with Arphitha suddenly driving in and proclaiming her love for him as the film ends.

Cast

 Puneeth Rajkumar as Shivaraj Aras
 Ramya as Shruthi
 Meera Jasmine as Aishwarya
 Srinivasa Murthy as Ramanna
 Komal as Daas
 Adi Lokesh as Manja
 Satyajith as hotelier
 P. N. Sathya
 Shankar Rao
 K. Prakash Shenoy
 Sai Prakash
 Ashwath Narayan
 NGEF Ramamurthy
 Yathiraj
 Radhakrishna
 Renukamma Murugodu as fruits seller
 Veena
 Darshan in a cameo appearance as Vijay
 Aditya in a cameo appearance as Vinay
 Shriya Saran in a cameo appearance as Arpitha.

Soundtrack

Reception 
A critic from Sify wrote that "On the whole Arasu is watchable for its lead performers". A critic from Rediff.com wrote that "Arrasu is a neat family entertainer".

Awards

Filmfare
 Best Actor for Puneeth Rajkumar

References

External links
 

2007 films
2000s Kannada-language films
Films set in Bangalore
Indian romantic drama films
Films scored by Joshua Sridhar
Films shot in Bangalore
Films shot in Germany
Films shot in Venice
Films directed by Mahesh Babu (director)